In the 1992 Milwaukee Brewers season, the team finished in second place in the American League East with a record of 92 wins and 70 losses.

Offseason
 October 15, 1991: George Canale was traded by the Brewers to the Montreal Expos for Alex Diaz.
 December 6, 1991: Jesse Orosco was sent to the Brewers by the Cleveland Indians as part of a conditional deal.
 December 11, 1991: Dale Sveum was traded by the Brewers to the Philadelphia Phillies for Bruce Ruffin.
 December 16, 1991: Mario Díaz was signed as a free agent by the Brewers.
 March 26, 1992: Gary Sheffield and Geoff Kellogg (minors) were traded by the Brewers to the San Diego Padres for Ricky Bones, José Valentín, and Matt Mieske.

Regular season

Season standings

Record vs. opponents

Notable transactions
 April 1, 1992: Mario Díaz was released by the Brewers.
 July 7, 1992: Jeff Kunkel was traded by the Brewers to the Chicago Cubs for Ced Landrum.

Roster

Player stats

Batting

Starters by position 
Note: Pos = Position; G = Games played; AB = At bats; H = Hits; Avg. = Batting average; HR = Home runs; RBI = Runs batted in

Other batters 
Note: G = Games played; AB = At bats; H = Hits; Avg. = Batting average; HR = Home runs; RBI = Runs batted in

Pitching

Starting pitchers 
Note: G = Games pitched; IP = Innings pitched; W = Wins; L = Losses; ERA = Earned run average; SO = Strikeouts

Other pitchers 
Note: G = Games pitched; IP = Innings pitched; W = Wins; L = Losses; ERA = Earned run average; SO = Strikeouts

Relief pitchers 
Note: G = Games pitched; W = Wins; L = Losses; SV = Saves; ERA = Earned run average; SO = Strikeouts

Awards and honors
 Pat Listach, American League Rookie of the Year

Farm system

The Brewers' farm system consisted of seven minor league affiliates in 1992. The Stockton Ports won the California League championship.

Notes

References
1992 Milwaukee Brewers team page at Baseball Reference
1992 Milwaukee Brewers team page at www.baseball-almanac.com

Milwaukee Brewers seasons
Milwaukee Brewers season
Milwaukee Brew